"Taking Chances" is a song recorded by Canadian singer Celine Dion, taken from her tenth English-language studio album of the same name (2007). It was written by Kara DioGuardi and former Eurythmics member, Dave Stewart for their band named Platinum Weird. The song was supposed to be released as a single in February 2007 from their unreleased self-titled album. However, after DioGuardi and Stewart recorded it, they played the track for Dion's husband René Angélil, who loved it and she recorded it.

It was released as the first single from Taking Chances in September 2007. "Taking Chances" is a pop ballad with a soft rock finish. Lyrically, it is about trusting and baring our souls to each other and committing to making something special. The line, "So talk to me, like lovers do" came from the Eurythmics song "Here Comes the Rain Again." The song received positive reviews from music critics, who praised Dion for taking risks and called it a hopeful and heartfelt song.

The song was a success around the world, peaking inside the top ten in Belgium, Canada, Denmark, France, Italy and Switzerland. It also peaked at number 40 on the UK Singles Chart, while on the Billboard Hot 100 chart, it reached number 54. It also topped the Hot Dance Club Play chart. The song was nominated for the Single of the Year at the Juno Awards of 2009. "Taking Chances" was covered on Fox's hit TV show Glee by Lea Michele's character Rachel Berry. Her version peaked at number 71 on the Billboard Hot 100 chart.

Background and writing 
"Taking Chances" was written by songwriter Kara DioGuardi and former Eurythmic Dave Stewart. The record label manager Jimmy Iovine put them together to write for the Pussycat Dolls, but DioGuardi and Stewart quickly realized that the music they were writing was best suited for them to record together. Iovine agreed and signed them to Interscope Records where they recorded an album as Platinum Weird, but the album was never released. In The Dave Stewart Songbook Vol. 1, Stewart explains that he and DioGuardi wrote the song in about 10 minutes one afternoon when movers were bringing furniture into her new Los Angeles home. 
 
"I could hear some windchimes just outside the open window where I was laying, so I picked up an acoustic guitar and was trying to play the same random pattern the chimes were making. Kara is a genius with melody and multitasking so as she's shouting to the movers she starts singing, 'Don't know much about your life,' much to the confusion of the workers. It was like a scene from a musical as the furniture was piling in, she was singing, 'What do you say to taking chances? What do you you say to jumping off the edge?' We literally were swapping lyrics, melodies and chords in real time while all this chaos was around us. The song was written about ourselves trusting and baring our souls to each other. About committing to making something special even though we knew we were this odd couple who had no other reason to do it other than we loved it."
After DioGuardi and Stewart recorded the song, they played it for Dion's husband René, who loved it. Dion released it as the title track and first single from her ninth English studio album, which was also the name of her World Tour. John Shanks produced the song. He also produced five other songs on Taking Chances. Kara DioGuardi also wrote and co-produced with Emanuel Kiriakou "Surprise Surprise" for the Taking Chances album. She has already written few songs for Dion in the past, including "One Heart." The latter was co-written and co-produced by John Shanks and Kara DioGuardi, and released as a single in 2003.

On 9 September 2007, the members of her fan club had a 24-hour advance preview of "Taking Chances" and its accompanying in-studio video. Later, the video was available through Amazon.com and Sympatico / MSN Music Store the following day. The song premiered on the radio on 10 September 2007 and was released as a music download on 29 October 2007 in the United States and Europe. The track was included later on her 2008 greatest hits My Love: Essential Collection. A live version was included in the Taking Chances World Tour: The Concert CD/DVD.

Composition 

"Taking Chances" is a pop song that begins with acoustic guitar, then expands into a fuller pop/rock instrumentation. Celine's vocals span from E3 to F♯5. The line, "So talk to me, like lovers do" came from the Eurythmics song "Here Comes the Rain Again." In an interview with Dave Stewart, he explained why he recycled the lyric: "Yeah, because Taking Chances is the same, me writing with Kara DioGuardi and deciding to enter into something together. So 'I don't know much about your life, don't know much about your world, but I don't want to be alone tonight on this planet they call Earth, right? So what do you say of taking chances?' And it builds up and builds up and gets more determined, which is Kara's personality, who's been through a lot, and she goes, you know, 'I've been beaten down' and all this kind of stuff. And then it flips into, 'So talk to me, talk to me like lovers do.' It's like pulling itself out of that, getting the strength, and actually nodding and tipping my hat to one of my own songs within the song."

Critical reception 
"Taking Chances" received critical acclaim. Bill Lamb of About.com wrote that "Dion's vocals are commanding and powerful." He also said: "The song opens the album and announces new directions in a truly exciting fashion," though he was disappointed with most of the following songs on the album. Chuck Taylor of Billboard wrote about the song that "it is destined for AC's top 10." Sarah Rodman from The Boston Globe wrote that "it builds from an acoustic strum into the kind of pleasant radio-ready crunch that Michelle Branch would recognize." Tammy La Gorce of Amazon.com called it a "hopeful, heartfelt track, which unfolds into an anthemic power ballad midway through, may be the best one." Nick Levine wrote a positive review for Digital Spy, describing the song: "It begins in surprisingly restrained fashion, with Dion crooning softly over a near-acoustic musical backdrop, but the soft rock bombast kicks in soon enough. The guitars surge tastefully; the drums thump like they belong on a Phil Collins solo record and Dion plays the banshee to perfection."

About.com's Bill Lamb listed as one of the Top 20 Pop Songs of 2007. He went to say that "She moves into slightly more rocking territory in highly tasteful fashion. Some pop fans may take a second look at Celine after hearing this track." The song was nominated for the category Single of the Year at the Juno Awards of 2009. Stephen Thomas Erlewine of AllMusic highlighted this song. Edna Gundersen from USA Today wrote, "She dials back the bombast on the title track, a midtempo rocker." Also Edna Gundersen from USA Today and Chris Willman of Entertainment Weekly have put this song on their "Download this" lists.

Commercial performance
In Canada, the song debuted at number 82 on the Canadian Hot 100 chart issue dated 29 September 2007. Later, it became the "Greatest Gainer", after climbing from number 82 to number 13, on the chart issue dated 6 October 2007. However, the song fell to number 30, in its third week. The following week, it climbed to number 29, before moving to number 26, in its fifth week. After weeks fluctuating on the chart, the song climbed to number 10, in its tenth week, on the chart issue dated 1 December 2007. It peaked at number 9, in its eleventh week, on the chart issue dated 8 December 2007. It was certified Gold for selling over 20,000 digital downloads.

"Taking Chances" debuted at number 54 on the Billboard Hot 100 chart issue dated 1 December 2007, becoming the "Highest Debut" of that week. Later, the song fell to number 68, on the chart issue dated 8 December 2007. It remained at number 68, on the chart issue dated 15 December 2007. On the chart issue dated 22 December 2007, the song became the "Biggest Free Faller", after falling to number 88, losing 20 positions. It spent 4 weeks on the Hot 100 chart. As of 8 April 2012, the digital single has sold 498,000 copies in total in the US, being her third best-selling digital single. The single was successful on the US Hot Dance Club Play chart, peaking at number 1 and becoming Dion's second song to do so, after "Misled" in 1994. "Taking Chances" also peaked at number 6 on the US Hot Adult Contemporary Tracks, giving Dion ownership of the most top 10 hits at the format with 21 during the last two decades.

The song debuted at number 58 on the UK Singles Chart, on 10 November 2007 and it peaked at number 40, on 17 November 2007. It spent 4 weeks on the chart. In France, the song debuted and peaked at number 7, on the SNEP chart. The song spent 22 consecutive weeks inside the French charts, until it dropped at number 91, on 5 April 2008. However, the song re-entered at number 88, on 10 January 2009, spending two more weeks. It re-appeared at number 94, on 4 April 2009, spending an additional two weeks. It re-entered once again on the chart at number 85, on 20 June 2009, staying for three more weeks. "Taking Chances" spent a total of 29 non-consecutive weeks on the chart. In Italy, the song debuted and peaked at number 5 on the FIMI charts, on 1 November 2007. Later, it fell to number 8, where it stayed for one more week. "Taking Chances" kept fluctuating on the chart for the next three weeks, until it reached number 9, on 22 December 2007.

In Denmark, the song debuted and peaked at number 29 on the Danish Singles Chart, on 23 November 2007. It dropped the chart at number 31, on 30 November 2007. However, the song re-entered the Danish chart at number 3, becoming its peak position, on 13 June 2008. In Austria, the song debuted at number 43 on the Ö3 Austria Top 40 chart, on 9 November 2007, before moving to number 35 the following week. It peaked at number 12, in its third week, remaining in its peak position the following week. It spent 14 weeks on the chart.

Music video 

The music video, directed by Paul Boyd, was filmed in three days, between 15–17 September 2007 in several different locations, in the Las Vegas Valley.  
It was released on 16 October 2007. The video features Dion breaking into a hotel and being chased. It also includes a guest appearance by one of the songwriters of the track, Dave A. Stewart. He described his cameo appearance as playing "a kind of enigmatic 'boss' character from a James Bond movie," and also commented that it was about 100 °F during filming.

The video itself follows Dion as she is taken into the city of Las Vegas, where she performs her concert show. In the video Dion watches herself as a hidden entity behind a motorcycle helmet stealing Dion's identity from her supposed hotel residency suite. At the end of the video, she took off her motorcycle helmet.

Promotion 
On 27 October 2007 Dion appeared on the fourth series of the British talent contest, The X Factor, as a mentor to the show's contestants. She also performed "Taking Chances" on the live show which was the world exclusive debut and her first UK performance for five years. On 12 November 2007, Dion appeared on The Oprah Winfrey Show and performed the song and took requests from Oprah's audience. On 14 November 2012, she went to The Ellen DeGeneres Show to perform the track. Later, on 18 November 2007 she performed the song live at the American Music Awards in Los Angeles. On 23 November 2007, she went to the American talkshow The View to perform "Taking Chances" as well as "Alone." On 27 November 2007, she performed the track on the ABC's dance competition show Dancing with the Stars. "Taking Chances" became also a part of the Taking Chances World Tour set list. The song was also performed in Dion's 2017 European tour.

Usage in popular culture and covers
"Taking Chances" was featured as a theme music for the promotional trailers for CBS's TV series Moonlight. It was later used in 2009 on the show So You Think You Can Dance Canada on the Top 20 performance show as a number choreographed by Stacey Tookey.

The song was covered on Fox's hit TV show Glee by Lea Michele's character Rachel Berry on the episode entitled "Preggers", in the first season. It peaked at number 71 on the Billboard Hot 100 charts when it was released.

Track listing and formats
 

European CD and digital single
"Taking Chances" – 4:07
"Map to My Heart" – 4:15

Japanese CD single
"Taking Chances" – 4:02
"To Love You More" (Radio Edit) – 4:39

European and Australian digital EP
"Taking Chances" – 4:07
"Map to My Heart" – 4:15
"Taking Chances" (I-Soul Extended Remix) – 7:33

European and Australian CD maxi-single
"Taking Chances" – 4:07
"Map to My Heart" – 4:15
"Taking Chances" (I-Soul Extended Remix) – 7:33
"Taking Chances" (In-studio Video) – 4:11

French CD single and digital EP
"Taking Chances" – 4:07
"Immensité" – 3:34
"Map to My Heart" – 4:15

French digital EP
"Taking Chances" – 4:07
"Immensité" – 3:34
"Map to My Heart" – 4:15
"Taking Chances" (I-Soul Extended Remix) – 7:33

French CD maxi-single
"Taking Chances" – 4:07
"Immensité" – 3:34
"Map to My Heart" – 4:15
"Taking Chances" (I-Soul Extended Remix) – 7:33
"Taking Chances" (In-studio Video) – 4:11

Remixes

"Taking Chances" (I-Soul Radio Edit) – 3:57
"Taking Chances" (I-Soul Extended Remix) – 7:33
"Taking Chances" (Jason Nevins Remix) – 3:43
"Taking Chances" (Jason Nevins Extended Mix) – 6:24
"Taking Chances" (Matt Piso Radio Edit) – 4:53
"Taking Chances" (Matt Piso Club Mix) – 7:16
"Taking Chances" (Ralphi Rosario & Craig J. Radio Edit) – 3:44
"Taking Chances" (Ralphi Rosario & Craig J. Full Vocal Radio Edit) – 4:11
"Taking Chances" (Ralphi Rosario & Craig J. Vocal Mix) – 9:02
"Taking Chances" (Ralphi Rosario & Craig J. Thick Dub) – 8:07

Charts

Weekly charts

Year-end charts

Certifications and sales

Credits and personnel
Recording locations
Recording - Henson Recording Studio (Los Angeles, California)
 Studio at the Palms (Paradise, Nevada, New York City)
 The Studio (Philadelphia)

Personnel
Songwriting –  Kara DioGuardi, David A. Stewart
Production –  John Shanks
Mixing  - Jeff Rothschild
Guitars & Bass  - John Shanks
Keyboards - Ned Douglas
Drums & Programming  - Jeff Rothschild
Backing Vocals  - Kara Dioguardi

Credits adapted from the liner notes of Taking Chances, Epic Records.

Release history

See also
2007 in British music charts

References

2000s ballads
2007 singles
2007 songs
Celine Dion songs
Columbia Records singles
Epic Records singles
Music videos directed by Paul Boyd
Pop ballads
Rock ballads
Song recordings produced by John Shanks
Songs written by David A. Stewart
Songs written by Kara DioGuardi